Manuela Trasobares Haro (born 28 August 1955) is a Spanish artist, operatic mezzo-soprano, and politician.

Trasobares was born in Figueres in the province of Girona, Catalonia, Spain. She studied fine arts at the Facultat de Belles Arts de Sant Jordi of University of Barcelona, painting and sculpture in the ateliers Massana and Leonardo da Vinci in Barcelona and bel canto in the Conservatory of Sofia. She has performed in operas at the Liceu in Barcelona, La Scala, and the Palau de la Música de València.

She has also directed opera shows and her works as a sculptor and as a painter have a clear surrealist influence.

As a politician and trans woman, she is the first Spanish transsexual town councilor in Geldo with the political party Acción Republicana Democrática Española (Spanish Democratic Republican Action).

References

External links
 Official website

1955 births
Living people
Painters from Catalonia
Opera singers from Catalonia
Women artists from Catalonia
20th-century Spanish women opera singers
Politicians from Catalonia
Transgender politicians
Transgender women
Operatic mezzo-sopranos
Spanish LGBT politicians
University of Barcelona alumni
Spanish women artists
21st-century Spanish women opera singers